Xenocoelomatidae is a family of cyclopoid copepods in the order Cyclopoida. There are at least two genera and four described species in Xenocoelomatidae.

Genera
These two genera belong to the family Xenocoelomatidae:
 Aphanodomus C. B. Wilson, 1924
 Xenocoeloma Caullery & Mesnil, 1915

References

Cyclopoida
Articles created by Qbugbot
Crustacean families